Leucostrophus alterhirundo is a moth of the family Sphingidae. It is found from Ethiopia and Somalia, south to Zambia and Malawi.

The wingspan is 39–48 mm. The abdomen upperside has a pale belt on tergites four and five. It is chalky white, without a bluish tint unless scales have been rubbed off. The abdomen underside has a gradually fading white colour, so the posterior half is clayish rather than black. Both wings are of a paler slate colour than Leucostrophus commasiae.

The larvae feed on Strychnos species.

References

Macroglossini
Moths described in 1871
Moths of Africa